Agah Oktay Güner (born 1937) is a Turkish journalist and politician who held various cabinet posts and served in different parties, including Nationalist Movement Party, Motherland Party and True Path Party.

Early life and education
Güner was born in Bayburt in 1937. He graduated from Konya High School. He received a degree in law from Ankara University and obtained his PhD in economics from the University of Paris. His PhD thesis was about economic state enterprises and economic development.

During his university studies in Ankara Güner began his political activity in 1954 being a member of the nationalist youth group Turkish Hearths.

Career and activities
Güner worked at different public institutions. In 1977 he joined the Nationalist Movement Party. He was first elected to the Parliament in 1977 and served as the deputy of Konya in the 16th term. In the 41st government he served as the minister of commerce between 21 July 1977 and 5 January 1978. Following the 1980 coup in Turkey he was arrested and sentenced to death. He later was acquitted and released from the prison.

He joined the Motherland Party and was elected to the Parliament in 1995 serving as a deputy of Ankara in the 20th term. In the 53rd government he was the minister of culture between 6 March and 28 June 1996. In 1999 he was elected as a deputy from Balıkesir and served in the 21st term of the Parliament. In 2002 he resigned from the Motherland Party and joined the True Path Party.

Güner was among the contributors of the newspapers Tercüman ve Türkiye. He is one of the writers of Yeniçağ newspaper.

Views
Güner is among the critics of the language simplification carried out by Mustafa Kemal Atatürk in 1926. He argued that Turkish youth had problems in understanding the Ottoman texts. After Güner was released from prison he stated "we are in prison, yet our ideology is in government" referring to both his colleagues who were still in the prison and the Turkish government which had been implementing nationalist policies closely similar to those of the National Movement Party.

Güner is one of the followers of the Rifaʽi order.

Personal life
Güner is married and has five children.

References

20th-century Turkish journalists
21st-century Turkish journalists
1937 births
Living people
People from Bayburt
Ankara University Faculty of Law alumni
Members of the 53rd government of Turkey
Members of the 16th Parliament of Turkey
Members of the 20th Parliament of Turkey
Members of the 21st Parliament of Turkey
Nationalist Movement Party politicians
Motherland Party (Turkey) politicians
Ministers of Culture of Turkey
Government ministers of Turkey
Members of the 41st government of Turkey
Deputies of Ankara
Deputies of Balıkesir
Deputies of Konya
Turkish prisoners sentenced to death
University of Paris alumni
Turkish nationalists